Ismail Yunos (born 24 October 1986) is a Singaporean centre-back who plays for S-League side Home United and the Singapore national football team.

Club career
Ismail has previously played for S.League clubs Home United, Gombak United and Young Lions.

International career
He was part of the team that won the Tiger Cup in 2005 and the 2007 ASEAN Football Championship two years later.  He was also part of the Singapore Under-23 team that took part in the 2005 Southeast Asian Games in Philippines and also won a bronze medal for the 2007 edition in Korat, Thailand.

Possessing a lanky frame and a composure belying his age, Ismail was called up by national team coach Radojko Avramovic into the Lions squad for the first time in September 2004 after a series of promising performances for the Under-18 and U-21 teams. But he only got his first team debut for the Singapore on 28 December 2006, in the invitational tournament, King's Cup held in Thailand, against Vietnam.

A mid-season transfer to Warriors F.C., Ismail played an exception role in marshalling the defense for the Warriors. Wearing the number 4 shirt, he made numerous tackles to deny the opponents from scoring. Ismail was instrumental in the Warriors 1-0 win over Albirex Niigata S FC when they clinched their first title in 5 years and their 9th title in the league's 19 years history.

Honours
Warriors
S League (1): 2014

International
Singapore
ASEAN Football Championship: 2004, 2007
Southeast Asian Games: Bronze Medal - 2007

References

External links

data2.7m.cn

Singaporean footballers
Singapore international footballers
Living people
1986 births
Gombak United FC players
Home United FC players
Singapore Premier League players
Association football central defenders
Young Lions FC players
Footballers at the 2006 Asian Games
Southeast Asian Games bronze medalists for Singapore
Southeast Asian Games medalists in football
Competitors at the 2007 Southeast Asian Games
Asian Games competitors for Singapore